{{DISPLAYTITLE:C16H20N2O}}
The molecular formula C16H20N2O (molar mass: 256.34 g/mol, exact mass: 256.1576 u) may refer to:

 Chanoclavine
 Chanoclavine II
 Fumigaclavine B
 Paliclavine

Molecular formulas